Muktainagar, also known as Edlabad is a town in the eastern part of Jalgaon district in northern Maharashtra and is the administrative seat of Muktainagar taluka.

History 
During British rule, Muktainagar taluka was known as Edlabad petha and was part of East Khandesh district. Around 1880, Muktainagar taluka was made part of Khandesh district's Bhusaval subdivision. Muktainagar taluk (then known as Edlabad mahal) was part of Bhusaval taluka.

Demographics
According to the 2011 Census of India, Muktainagar had 5,352 households and a population of 23,970, of which 12,433 were males and 11,537 females. The population of children below six years of age was 3,201, making up 13.35% of the total population of the village. The sex ratio of Muktainagar village is 928, which is close to the Maharashtra state average of 929. The child sex ratio is 820, lower than the Maharashtra average of 894. In 2011, the literacy rate of Muktainagar village was 84.41% compared to an average of 82.34% in Maharashtra. In Muktainagar male literacy stands at 88.86% and female literacy at 79.70%. Members of scheduled castes (SC) constituted 10.75% of the population of Muktainagar village, while scheduled tribes (ST) made up 5.25%.

Education Facilities
G.G. Khadse College is college offering undergraduate and postgraduate courses. A veterinary college is expected to start in 2020.

Politics 
The former President of India Pratibha Patil started her political career in Muktainagar in the early 1960s. The former revenue minister of Maharashtra, Eknath Khadse, was MLA from Muktainagar from 1989 to 2019. Shiv Sena's Chandrakant Nimba Patil is the current MLA from the Muktainagar Vidhan Sabha constituency. He narrowly defeated Rohini Eknath Khadse of the BJP in the 2019 Maharashtra Legislative Assembly elections.

See also
 Muktainagar (Vidhan Sabha constituency)

References

Jalgaon district
Cities and towns in Jalgaon district
Talukas in Maharashtra